Niemeyera whitei known as the rusty plum or plum boxwood is a rare tree of eastern Australia. It occurs on poorer soils in areas below 600 metres above sea level. Found in gully, warm temperate or littoral rainforests. From the Macleay River, New South Wales to Tallebudgera Creek in south eastern Queensland.

Description 
A small or medium-sized tree with rusty coloured leaves when viewed from below. Up to 20 metres tall and a stem diameter of 50 cm. The trunk is irregular and fluted, not cylindrical. Creamy grey bark with a corky quality, the bark is not smooth, with round peeling bark, which causes bumps and pits. Small branches thick and covered in rusty hairs. When broken, a white milky sap appears.

Leaves are 5 to 15 cm long, 2 to 5 cm wide, alternate on the stem with smooth edges (no serrations). Smooth and green on top, paler below with rusty hairs. Leaf veins prominently seen under the leaf, not so evident on the top. 12 to 15 lateral veins, at about 45 to 60 degrees, angled from the midrib.

Flowers, fruit & regeneration 
Creamy green flowers form in clusters from September to October. Parts of the flowers are also a rusty brown. The fruit is a berry, 2 to 7 cm in diameter. Initially red, then turning purple and black. Inside is a large spherical seed (rarely 2 seeds), 2 to 3 cm in diameter and pink edible flesh. On one side of the seed is a glossy eye shaped scar, 1 to 2.5 cm long. The seed is mostly covered with light brownish down except the scar which is glossy mid brown. Fruit matures from September to November. Regeneration takes up to 6 months. Soaking and peeling of the seed is advised for best results, usually all seeds germinate.

References

 
 

whitei
Flora of New South Wales
Flora of Queensland
Trees of Australia
Vulnerable biota of Queensland
Vulnerable flora of Australia
Taxa named by André Aubréville